Sheila Kelly is an American writer. She mostly writes novels in a variety of genres and under several pseudonyms.  Among them are science fiction (as S. L. Viehl), romantic fiction (as Lynn Viehl, Gena Hale, Rebecal Hall), and Christian fiction (as Rebecca Kelly).

She enjoys quilting, reading, cooking, painting, and knitting.

Bibliography

As S. L. Viehl

Stardoc 
 Stardoc (ROC, 2000)
 Beyond Varallan (ROC, 2000)
 Endurance (ROC, 2001)
 Shockball (ROC, 2001)
 Eternity Row (ROC, 2002)
 Rebel Ice (ROC, 2006)
 Plague of Memory (ROC, 2007) (previously Clanson)
 Omega Games (ROC, 2008)
 Crystal Healer (ROC, 2009)
 Dream Called Time (ROC, 2010)

Set in the StarDoc universe 
 Blade Dancer (ROC, 2003)
 Bio Rescue (ROC, 2004)
 Afterburn (ROC, 2005)

As Gena Hale 
 Paradise Island (Onyx, 2001)
 Dream Mountain (Onyx, 2001)
 Sun Valley (Onyx, 2002)

As Rebecca Kelly

Tales from Grace Chapel Inn 
 Going to the Chapel (Guideposts, 2003)
 Home for the Holidays (Guideposts, 2003)
 Portraits of the Past (Guideposts, 2003)
 Midsummer Melody (Guideposts, 2004)
 Promises to Keep (Guideposts, 2004)
 Life Is a Three-Ring Circus (Guideposts, 2005)

As Lynn Viehl

The Darkyn 
 If Angels Burn (Signet, 2005)
 Private Demon (Signet, 2005)
 Dark Need (Signet, 2006)
 Night Lost (Signet, 2007)
 Evermore (Signet, 2008)
 Twilight Fall (Signet, 2008)
 Stay the Night (Signet, 2009)
 Nightborn (Signet, March 2012)

The Kyndred 
 Shadowlight (Signet, 2009)
 Dreamveil (Signet, June 2010)
 Frostfire (Signet, January 2011)
 Nightshine( Signet, November 2011)

Lords of the Darkyn 
 Nightborn  (Signet, March 2012)
 Nightbred  (Signet, Dezember 2012)
 Nightbound (Signet, May 2013)

Disenchanted & Co. Toriana Universe – Alternate history and Steampunk 
 0.5 My Lord Mayhem ebook (July 2013)
 1. Disenchanted & Co. (January 2014) Contains Part 1:Her Ladyship's Curse (Pocket Star ebook, August 2013) and Part 2:His Lordship possessed (Pocket Star ebook, October 2013)  
 1.4 Three Gifts ebook (December 2013)
 1.5 Forget-Me-Knot ebook  
 2. The Clockwork Wolf (Pocket Books, February 2014) 
 In The Leaves  ebook (October 2014); prequel to Disenchanted & Co.

References

External links 
 
 Bibliography at The Eternal Night
 Interview by Lazette Gifford
 

20th-century American novelists
21st-century American novelists
American science fiction writers
American women short story writers
American women novelists
1961 births
Living people
Novelists from Florida
American romantic fiction writers
Women science fiction and fantasy writers
Women romantic fiction writers
20th-century American women writers
21st-century American women writers
20th-century American short story writers
21st-century American short story writers
20th-century pseudonymous writers
21st-century pseudonymous writers
Pseudonymous women writers